Joseph Hussey (1660–1726) was an English Calvinist and congregationalist minister.

Life
Hussey was born in Fordingbridge, Hampshire. After studying with the ejected minister Robert Whitaker, he attended Charles Morton's dissenting academy at Newington Green. He attributed a 1686 conversion to the reading of Stephen Charnock's The Existence and Attributes of God.

In 1688, Hussey underwent ordination in a Reformed church. He was pastor at Hitchin, and then from 1691 in Cambridge, Stephen Scandrett preaching as he took up the post. At that time the congregation met at the Hog Hill church, where a piece of land had been bought in 1687 on the basis of the Declaration of Indulgence; and it took on the name "Great Meeting". From 1694 Hussey's Cambridge church was congregational; but there was a Presbyterian secession in 1696, who moved to a meeting in Green Street. 
 
He moved to a ministry in Petticoat Lane, London, in 1719.

Works
He wrote:

 The Gospel Feast Opened (1693)
  The Glory of Christ Unveil'd or the Excellency of Christ Vindicated (1706)
 God's Operations of Grace but No Offers of His Grace (1707).

The two latter books, on the denial of the free offer of the gospel, were influential in the formation of English hyper-Calvinism. Distinctive of Hussey's views were supralapsarianism, the doctrine of irresistible grace, and a christology derived in part from Thomas Goodwin. Those who followed Hussey's views included William Bentley, John Skepp and Samuel Stockell.

References
Peter Toon, The Emergence of Hyper-Calvinism in English Nonconformity, 1689-1765, Chapter IV, No Offers of Grace (The Theology of Hussey and Skepp); online.
Walter Wilson, The History and Antiquities of Dissenting Churches (1814), Vol. 4, pp. 411–2.

Notes

  Joseph Hussey Glory of Christ Website
  Surman Library entry
  The Emergence of Hyper-Calvinism in English Nonconformity, 1689-1765 by Peter Toon (1967)

1660 births
1726 deaths
English Congregationalist ministers
English Dissenters
English sermon writers
English theologians
People from Fordingbridge
Social history of London
Hyper-Calvinism
17th-century Calvinist and Reformed theologians
17th-century English writers
17th-century English male writers
18th-century Calvinist and Reformed theologians
18th-century English non-fiction writers
18th-century English male writers
English Calvinist and Reformed theologians